Vizcaya (Spanish, 'Biscay') may refer to:

Places
  Biscay, a Basque region and a province of Spain 
 Biscay (Congress of Deputies constituency)
 Biscay (Basque Parliament constituency)
 Biscay (Senate constituency)
 Vizcaya Museum and Gardens, formerly Villa Vizcaya, in Miami, Florida,  U.S.
 Vizcaya station, in Miami, Florida, U.S.

People
 Pierre de Vizcaya (1894–1933), Spanish motor racer

Other uses
 Vizcaya (planthopper), a genus of insects
 Spanish cruiser Vizcaya, a Spanish Navy armored cruiser that fought in the Spanish–American War
 Vizcaya (1890), Filipino World War II era freighter

See also
 Biscay (disambiguation)
 Nueva Vizcaya, a province on Luzon Island, Philippines
 Nueva Vizcaya, New Spain, in present-day Mexico